Humbert Jean René Balsan (21 August 1954 – 10 February 2005) was a French film producer and chairman of the European Film Academy. He was known for securing financing and distribution for diverse and often challenging films.

In February 2005, Balsan was found dead in the offices of his production company, Ognon Pictures, in Paris. He was known to have suffered from depression, and killed himself by hanging.

Early life and career
Born in Arcachon in 1954, Balsan was part of France's upper class as a member of the Wendel family, an industrial dynasty.  He received a Jesuit education in Amiens and later studied economics in Paris.  In 1973, Balsan's film career began when he was cast as Gawain in Robert Bresson's Lancelot of the Lake (1974).

While Balsan continued to act in small roles in friends' films (he played a pirate in Jacques Rivette's Noroit (1976)), his interest turned to production.  He assisted Bresson on The Devil, Probably (1977) in 1976 and lensed a documentary portrait of French music teacher Nadia Boulanger the following year. In 2004 he was a member of the jury at the 26th Moscow International Film Festival.

Role of producer 
Balsan became a producer in 1978 with the filming of Pierre Kast's Le Soleil en Face (Face to the Sun) (1980).  The same year, he acted in and co-produced Jean-Louis Trintignant's Le Maître-nageur (1979).

During the 1980s, Balsan lent not only his screen presence to Samuel Fuller for the then-expatriated director's French-language film Les Voleurs de la nuit (Thieves After Dark) (1984) but his Paris apartment as well. Fuller, who lived in France with his wife and daughter for 13 years beginning in 1982, would recount this period in his memoir (with Christa Lang Fuller) A Third Face: My Tale of Writing, Fighting, and Filmmaking.

As a patron of France's women filmmakers, Balsan facilitated a group that included Claire Denis, Sabine Franel, Brigitte Roüan, and Sandrine Veysset.  He financed Roüan's Post Coitum, Animal Triste (1997) on the stipulation that the director, who like Balsan began her film career in front of the camera, play the film's lead role.

Balsan also came to be known as a champion of Arab cinema.  He produced Elia Suleiman's Divine Intervention (2003), which in 2002 became the first Palestinian film to play at the Cannes Film Festival.  It was nominated for the Palme d'Or and eventually won the Grand Jury Prize.  The producer returned to Cannes in 2004 with Youssef Chahine's Alexandria... New York (2004), his ninth film with the Egyptian director since 1985's Adieu, Bonaparte.  Balsan also presented The Gate of Sun (2004), his second film with Yousry Nasrallah, who adapted the Elias Khoury novel.  The 4-hour epic screened in the Official Selection and depicted the history of Palestine from 1943 to the present.  Later that year, Balsan's production Le Grand Voyage (2004) won its director, Moroccan émigré Ismaël Ferroukhi, a best first feature prize at the 2004 Venice Film Festival.

However, the results of Balsan's efforts did not always please everyone.  Balsan, who would typically enlist European television and business entities to co-finance Arab region-produced works, was cited by Al-Ahram Weekly'''s Hani Mustafa for being vulnerable to an investor-friendly system that tends to compromise the stories told in Middle-Eastern films.

Over the course of his career, Balsan played a role in the production of over 60 films, including several for filmmaking pair Merchant-Ivory.  Among the last of his films to see a release are Denis's The Intruder (2004) and Lars von Trier's Manderlay (2006), which he co-produced.

 Father of My Children Father of My Children is a 2009 French film by Mia Hansen-Løve inspired by the life of Balsan.

 Selected filmography 
 Process (2004)
 Alexandria... New York (2004)
 The Gate of Sun (2004)
 Divine Intervention (2003) 
 Martha...Martha (2002) 
 Samia (2001)
 Rembrandt (1999) 
 Destiny (1998) 
 After Sex (1998)
 Will It Snow for Christmas? (1996)
 Adieu Bonaparte (1985)
 Noroît (1976)

References

 "Humbert Balsan" by Ronald Bergan, The Guardian, February 23, 2005, retrieved April 4, 2006
 "Press Release of the French Cinémathèque," by Claude Berri, et al., Masters of Cinema website, retrieved April 4, 2006
 "Humbert Balsan 1954–2005" by Dave Kehr, Rouge website, retrieved April 4, 2006
 "When the Tables Are Turned in Adultery's Secret Rooms", by Alan Riding, New York Times, March 8, 1998
 "Featured Player: Humbert Balsan" by Ali Jaafar, Variety, May 30, 2004, retrieved April 4, 2006
 "Producing award-winning Arab cinema" by Ali Jaafar, The Daily Star'', February 2, 2005, retrieved April 4, 2006

External links

1954 births
2005 suicides
French film producers
French male film actors
People from Arcachon
Suicides by hanging in France
2005 deaths